Café Majestic is an historic café, located at Rua de Santa Catarina, in Porto, Portugal.

The building is from the Art Nouveau period, reminiscent of Parisian cafés at the time.

Present day 
The café went through decades of decline, until it was considered a building of national historical interest in 1983. After major restoration works, it reopened in July 1994 in the original Belle Époque style.
Since the 1980s it has become iconic in Porto and is a popular destination in the city.

References

 Bibliography 

 Café Majestic''. Porto: Ed. Quiosque.org, 2006.
 Porto de Encontro n.º 34, special edition 2001, Porto municipality

External links 
 
 Recipe
 Café Majestic, Direção-Geral do Património Cultural

Coffeehouses and cafés
Buildings and structures in Porto
Pages using the Kartographer extension
Art Nouveau architecture in Portugal
Restaurants in Portugal